Mitch Morgan is a cocktail.

Mitch Morgan may also refer to:

Dr. Mitch Morgan, a character in Zoo, an American TV series that premiered in 2015